Sharoy (Şara) is a rural locality (a selo) and the administrative center of Sharoysky District, the Chechen Republic, Russia. (The selo of Khimoy serves as the administrative center of Sharoysky Municipal District). Population:

References

Notes

Sources

Rural localities in Sharoysky District